Mitcham tram stop is a Tramlink stop in Mitcham in the London Borough of Merton. The stop is located between Belgrave Walk and Mitcham Junction. It is located just east of the former Mitcham railway station, which closed in 1997. The tram stop consists of twin platforms accessible by ramps at either end.

Infrastructure 
Due to limited track space in the cutting northwest of the station towards Belgrave Walk tram stop, the tracks are interlaced for a short distance with one rail of the southeast bound track between the two rails of the northwest bound track. East of the station there used to be single track to Mitcham Junction Station.

Double line track 
In late June 2012 a double line track was opened from Mitcham to Mitcham Junction, save for a short stretch of single track immediately to the west of Mitcham Junction due to the limited clearance under the road bridge. The track layout allows two trams to travel between the stations at the same time. Work started in Spring 2012 at the site laying the new track and installing the new OHLE (over head line) cables. The job took about three months to complete and 18 test tram runs passed successfully before opening.

Connections

London Buses routes 118 and 280; and night routes N44 and N133 serve the tram stop.

Gallery

References

Tramlink stops in the London Borough of Merton
Railway stations in Great Britain opened in 2000